The Lakhari Valley Wildlife Sanctuary is located in Ganjam District, Odisha, India.

The wildlife sanctuary has an area , in the Lakhari Valley of the Eastern Ghats range. The plant communities include coastal Sal (Shorea robusta) forests and mixed deciduous forests. Lakhari Valley is located in the Eastern Highlands moist deciduous forests ecoregion.

Villagers staying near the gate of the sanctuary report the absence of any significant wildlife in the region belonging to Chandragiri Range.

References

Eastern Highlands moist deciduous forests
Wildlife sanctuaries in Odisha
Protected areas with year of establishment missing